James Sealy, (19 March 1876 – 4 February 1949) was an Irish rugby union player who won nine caps for Ireland and four for the British Isles. Sealy also represented Ireland in Hockey, and in 1928 was made president of the IRFU.

During his international career, Sealey represented Dublin University at club level and took part in the 1896 British Lions tour to South Africa.

He later worked as a barrister and was appointed King's Counsel, and later as a judge.

Sealy was the son-in-law of Ireland's first president, Douglas Hyde, having married Una Hyde Sealy.

References

1876 births
1949 deaths
Ireland international rugby union players
Irish rugby union players
British & Irish Lions rugby union players from Ireland
Dublin University Football Club players
Rugby union forwards
Rugby union players from County Dublin
People from Dundrum, Dublin
Sportspeople from Dún Laoghaire–Rathdown
Irish male field hockey players
Field hockey players from County Dublin
20th-century Irish judges